The Captain John Mawdsley House, located at 228 Spring Street, is one of the oldest houses in Newport, Rhode Island.

The earliest rear part of the house was built on Spring Street before 1680, probably by Jireh Bull. Bull married Godsgift Arnold, daughter of Gov. Benedict Arnold. Captain John Mawdsley, a privateer, lived in the house in the eighteenth century and constructed the large front addition to the house. The Mawdsley House is located on 228 Spring Street and was added to the National Register of Historic Places in 1983. The house was owned by Historic New England (SPNEA) until it was sold in the late twentieth century.

See also 
List of the oldest buildings in Rhode Island
Henry Bull House
Jireh Bull Blockhouse
National Register of Historic Places listings in Newport County, Rhode Island

References

Images

External links 

Houses completed in 1680
Houses on the National Register of Historic Places in Rhode Island
Houses in Newport, Rhode Island
Historic American Buildings Survey in Rhode Island
National Register of Historic Places in Newport, Rhode Island
Historic district contributing properties in Rhode Island
1680 establishments in Rhode Island